Dimock can refer to:
Dimock, South Dakota
Dimock Township, Pennsylvania
Dimock (surname)
See also:
Dymock, Gloucestershire, home of the …
Dymock poets